Virtù is a concept theorized by Niccolò Machiavelli, centered on the martial spirit and ability of a population or leader, but also encompassing a broader collection of traits necessary for maintenance of the state and "the achievement of great things."

In a secondary development, the same word came to mean an object of art.

Classical and medieval origins
Virtù, an Italian word meaning "virtue" or "power", is derived from the Latin virtus (lit. "manliness"). It describes the qualities desirable for a man, as opposed to vizio (vice). In the Italian language, the term virtù is historically related to the Greek concept of arete, the Latin virtus, and Medieval Catholic virtues, e.g. the Seven virtues. Thus Machiavelli's use of the term is linked to the concept of virtue ethics. 

Aristotle had early raised the question "whether we ought to regard the virtue of a good man and that of a sound citizen as the same virtue"; Thomas Aquinas had continued to stress that sometimes "someone is a good citizen who has not the quality...[of] a good man".

Machiavelli suggests a different set of virtues than Aristotle and Thomas Aquinas, apparently with less focus on beneficence and concord, and with more focus on courage. According to Machiavelli, virtù includes pride, bravery, skill, forcefulness, and an amount of ruthlessness coupled with the willingness to do evil when necessary.

Florentines

Florentine republicans at the turn of the 16th Century like Francesco Guicciardini rediscovered the classical concept of the virtue of the active citizen, and looked to it for an answer to the problems of preserving their city-state's independence.

Machiavelli extended the study of classical virtue in the sense of skill, valor and leadership, to encompass the individual prince or war-leader as well.

Virtù, for Machiavelli, was not equivalent to moral virtue, but was instead linked to the raison d'État.  Indeed, what was good for the prince may be contradictory to that which is morally good in both the classical and Christian sense.

Influence
Both the positive Machiavellian idealisation of the virtues of ancient Roman republicanism, and the negative image of virtù as realpolitik passed into the wider European consciousness over the centuries that followed.

Artistic value

A secondary English meaning developed in the 18th century was a curio or art-object - as being something of value in itself. Thus Horace Walpole could refer to “my books, my virtus and my other follies”.

Following the establishment of the Royal Academy in 1768, one contemporary considered that “the taste for virtu has become universal; persons of all ranks and degrees set up for connoisseurs”.

See also
Hercules at the crossroads
Virtuosos

References

Further reading
Harvey Mansfield, Machiavelli's Virtue (1998)

Machiavellianism
Niccolò Machiavelli
Virtue